The Wanapitei River (French: Rivière Wanapitei) is a river in Northeastern Ontario, Canada. It is in the Great Lakes Basin and is a right tributary of the French River.

From there, it flows north and east, taking in two small tributaries and continuing to a point 20 kilometres southwest of the Ishpatina Ridge, where it turns south. After approximately 60 kilometres, the river flows into Lake Wanapitei in the northeastern portion of Greater Sudbury. At the south end of the lake, the river continues, flowing south until it joins the French River near the latter's mouth on Georgian Bay on Lake Huron.

Ontario Power Generation operates three hydroelectric generating stations on the river as well as one control dam, at Wanapitei Lake.

The river's name comes from the Ojibwa word waanabidebiing, or "concave-tooth [shaped] water", which describes the shape of Lake Wanapitei. A community which takes its name from the river is spelled Wahnapitae. However, the Wanapitei spelling is correct for both the lake and the river.

On June 2, 2013, a rail bridge crossing the Wanapitei River at Wanup collapsed, causing a train derailment.

See also
List of rivers of Ontario

References

Rivers of Greater Sudbury
Rivers of Sudbury District